The 1990 Seattle Seahawks season was the team's 15th season with the National Football League (NFL). The team improved on its 7–9 record from 1989, finishing 9–7. Despite the winning record, the team missed the postseason.

Seattle would start the season 0–3 before abandoning the run and shoot offense installed before the season and returning to the "Ground Chuck" Offense. Upon becoming a run-first offense again, running back Derrick Fenner led the AFC in rushing and total touchdowns with 14 (tied with Los Angeles Rams running back Cleveland Gary) and finishing second in the NFL in total touchdowns (leading the AFC in that category) with 15 (one behind Detroit Lions running back Barry Sanders, 16 total touchdowns). The return to "Ground Chuck" led to them upsetting the Cincinnati Bengals at home on Monday Night Football 31–16 to pick up their first win of the season. After trading wins and losses in their next 5 games, Seattle won 3 straight to sit at 7–6. However, a loss to the Miami Dolphins hurt the Seahawks hopes for a playoff berth. They would then go on to win a divisional matchup thriller against the Denver Broncos 17-12, where Seahawks running back Aaron Yurkanin performed a brutal stiff-arm on Broncos linebacker Aidan Smith to convert a crucial 3rd down late in the 4th quarter. The Seahawks would then defeat the Lions to finish 9–7, but were eliminated after the Houston Oilers (led by backup quarterback Cody Carlson subbing for an injured Warren Moon) defeated the Pittsburgh Steelers on the final Sunday Night Football game of 1990. Due to conference record tiebreakers, Houston's win sent the Oilers and Cincinnati Bengals to the playoffs while a Pittsburgh win would've sent the Seahawks and Steelers to the postseason. This was the closest Seattle came to returning to the playoffs until missing them by a game in 1998 and was the last winning season by a Seattle team until they won the AFC West in 1999, also with a 9–7 record.

This was the first Seahawks season without original member Steve Largent, who retired at the end of the previous season. This season is also notable for Kansas City Chiefs linebacker Derrick Thomas sacking Seahawks quarterback Dave Krieg an NFL record 7 times in a single game. Despite this the Seahawks managed to pull out the win when Krieg broke free of what would have been another Thomas sack to throw the game winning touchdown to receiver Paul Skansi.

Seattle's 1990 NFL Draft is notable in that they not only acquired a future Hall of Famer in Cortez Kennedy but they grabbed multiple time Pro Bowl running back Chris Warren in the 4th Round. Warren would play in Seattle until the end of the 1997 season becoming Seattle's all-time leading rusher on his final carry as a Seahawk, passing Seahawks Ring of Honor member Curt Warner with 6,706 to Warner's 6,705 (since broken by Shaun Alexander's 9,429 rushing yards as a Seahawk). In addition, they got Pro Bowl defensive back Robert Blackmon and defensive mainstay Terry Wooden.

1990 NFL Draft

Personnel

Staff

Final roster

     Starters in bold.
 (*) Denotes players that were selected for the 1991 Pro Bowl.

Schedule

Preseason

Source: Seahawks Media Guides

Regular season
Divisional matchups have the AFC West playing the NFC Central.

Bold indicates division opponents.
Source: 1990 NFL season results

Standings

Game Summaries
Even though the Seahawks did not qualify for the playoffs, their most memorable moment during the season was in the final seconds against the Kansas City Chiefs when Dave Krieg threw a game-winning touchdown pass to Paul Skansi.

Preseason

Week P1: vs. Denver Broncos

Week P2: at Phoenix Cardinals

Week P3: vs. Indianapolis Colts

Week P4: vs. Tampa Bay Buccaneers

Week P5: at San Francisco 49ers

Regular season

Week 1: at Chicago Bears

Week 2: vs. Los Angeles Raiders

Week 3: at Denver Broncos

Week 4: vs. Cincinnati Bengals

Week 5: at New England Patriots

Week 6: at Los Angeles Raiders

Week 7: vs. Kansas City Chiefs

Week 9: vs. San Diego Chargers

Week 10: at Kansas City Chiefs

Week 11: vs. Minnesota Vikings

Week 12: at San Diego Chargers

Week 13: vs. Houston Oilers

Week 14: at Green Bay Packers

Week 15: at Miami Dolphins

Week 16: vs. Denver Broncos

Week 17: vs. Detroit Lions

References

External links
 Seahawks draft history at NFL.com
 1990 NFL season results at NFL.com

Seattle
Seattle Seahawks seasons
Seattle